Ventenat is a surname. Notable people with the surname include:

Étienne Pierre Ventenat (1757–1808), French botanist, brother of Louis
Louis Ventenat (1765–1794), French priest and naturalist

See also
Ventenata, a genus of plants in the grass family